This was the first edition of the tournament, primarily created due to the one-week delay of the 2021 French Open.

Jonathan Erlich and Andrei Vasilevski won the title, defeating André Göransson and Rafael Matos in the final, 6–4, 6–1.

Seeds

Draw

Draw

References

External Links
Main Draw

Belgrade Open - Doubles